Jubilee Productions Private Limited is an Indian film production and distribution company found by producer Joy Thomas in the year 1975. The company was initially formed as Jubilee Pictures for the distribution of films in Kerala and later following success it was transformed to Jubilee Productions. The head office of Jubilee Productions is situated in Kottayam, Kerala. Joy Thomas won the one National Film Award & one Filmfare Award.

Distributions
Joy Thomas distributed Malayalam and Tamil movies in Kerala under the banner of Jubilee Pictures.

Productions
After a successful career in distribution, Joy Thomas incorporated Jubilee Productions for production of movies. All movies produced under Jubilee Productions was distributed by Jubilee itself.

References

External links
 Official Website

Film distributors of India
Film production companies of Kerala
1975 establishments in Kerala
Mass media companies established in 1975
Companies based in Kottayam